Statistics of Nemzeti Bajnokság I in the 1993–94 season.

Overview
It was contested by 16 teams, and Vác FC won the championship.

League standings

Results

Relegation play-offs 

|}

Statistical leaders

Top goalscorers

See also
1993–94 Magyar Kupa

References
Hungary - List of final tables (RSSSF)

Nemzeti Bajnokság I seasons
1
Hun